The Charles and Lynn Schusterman Family Philanthropies is a philanthropic organization founded in Tulsa, Oklahoma.

History
In 1987, Charles Schusterman and Lynn Schusterman, whose family business, Samson Investment, had grown to become one of the nation's largest independent oil and gas companies, created the Charles and Lynn Schusterman Family Foundation.

Giving historically focused largely on the global Jewish community, Israel, and the family's hometown of Tulsa, Oklahoma, but later expanded to support equity and inclusion efforts in the U.S. After Charles' death in 2000, Lynn Schusterman continued to lead the organization, joined by her daughter, Stacy H. Schusterman. Lynn became chair emerita of the organization in 2018, and Stacy Schusterman assumed the role of  chair. In 2021, the family began to use the name Charles and Lynn Schusterman Family Philanthropies for their philanthropic work.

Activities
The organization more than doubled annual giving to over $400 million in 2020. The organization is known for supporting Jewish causes and organizations around the world as well as its work in Israel. In the U.S., it also supports: K-12 public education improvements, criminal justice reform, and gender and reproductive equity. It also supports youth development and advocacy in the Tulsa, Oklahoma area. The organization upped its education spending from $63 million in 2019 to $105 million in 2020. During 2020, the organization gave $150 million in COVID-19 relief. It has partnered with initiatives to protect voting rights, help reduce poverty, and promote economic mobility for people leaving the criminal justice system. It has also invested in equitable care infrastructure, such as universal paid family and medical leave, and accessible childcare.

References

Philanthropic organizations based in the United States
Organizations based in Oklahoma
1987 establishments in Oklahoma
Tulsa, Oklahoma
Organizations established in 1987